Griesser is a surname. Notable people with the surname include:

Fritz Griesser (1929–2013), Swiss sprinter
Thomas Griesser (born 1967), Austrian sprinter
Winslow W. Griesser, station keeper in the United States Lifesaving Service

See also
11547 Griesser, a main-belt asteroid